Death Before Dishonor (DBD or DB4D for short) is an American beatdown hardcore band from Boston, Massachusetts. They are influenced by artists such as Blood for Blood, Madball, Agnostic Front, SSD, Suicidal Tendencies, Pennywise, Death Threat. Their initial releases were on Spook City Records; the group signed with Bridge Nine Records in 2005.

Members

Current
Bryan Harris- vocals (2000-present)
Frankie Puopolo – guitar (2008-present), bass (2000-2008)
B-Roll - guitar (2005-2010, 2021-present)
Greg Chihoski – bass (2019-present)
Ben Hilton – drums (2011-present)

Former

Colin Reilly – guitar (2010-2021)
Dave X – guitar (2005-2007)
Erik Deitz – guitar (2000-2005)
Dan Loftus – drums (2000-2008)
Rob Deangelis – bass (2008-2010)

Timeline

Discography

* - reissue contains 4 bonus tracks (from split CD with Nourish the Flame).

** - reissue contains 3 new studio tracks and 6 live tracks recorded at CBGB's on July 23, 2006

*** - limited edition single contains 3 songs from the Count Me In album.

Music videos
 Born from Misery (2006)
 Break Through It All (2007)
 True Defeat (2019)
 Freedom Dies (2019)

References

External links
Bridge 9 Records - Death Before Dishonor
Official MySpace

Musical groups from Boston
Bridge 9 Records artists
Hardcore punk groups from Massachusetts